Age of Shadows may refer to:

 Age of Shadows suite from 01011001 by Ayreon
 Ultima Online: Age of Shadows, 2003 video game expansion pack
 The Age of Shadows, 2016 South Korean film